Philipomyia is a genus of horse fly belonging to the family Tabanidae subfamily Tabaninae.

These flies are found in most of Europe and in the Near East.

Species
Philipomyia aprica (Meigen, 1820)
Philipomyia graeca (Fabricius, 1794)
Philipomyia rohdendorfi (Olsufjev, 1937)

References

 Fauna Europaea
 Biolib

Tabanidae
Diptera of Europe
Tabanoidea genera